Forest Glade Cemetery is the oldest cemetery in Somersworth, New Hampshire. It was listed on the National Register of Historic Places in 2017, and the New Hampshire State Register of Historic Places in 2021.

Description and history
Forest Glade Cemetery is located southwest of downtown Somersworth, on the west side of Maple Street between Tates Brook Road and Bartlett Avenue. While the road frontage of the property is roughly straight, the rear line of the developed portion of the cemetery follows a broad curve. The rolling landscape has circulation roads laid out harmoniously with the terrain, which is dotted with mature plantings. The cemetery's prominent architectural features are the Furber Chapel, a stone English country chapel designed by Henry Vaughan and built in 1898, and the entrance gate, a stone arch bearing the inscription "Until the day dawns and the shadows flee away".

The cemetery was established in 1851, not long after Somersworth separated from Rollinsford, and was its first municipal cemetery. It has more than 7,000 burials, the oldest dating to 1852. In addition to more than 800 family plots, the cemetery has a dedicated section for members of the American Legion and the Grand Army of the Republic, as well as sections specifically consecrated for Jewish burials, and an area for the burial of the indigent.

See also

National Register of Historic Places listings in Strafford County, New Hampshire

References

Cemeteries on the National Register of Historic Places in New Hampshire
Buildings and structures in Strafford County, New Hampshire
1851 establishments in New Hampshire
National Register of Historic Places in Strafford County, New Hampshire
Somersworth, New Hampshire
Cemeteries established in the 1850s